Joseph C. Szabo (born December 26, 1957) is a former government official who was the twelfth Federal Railroad Administrator of the United States. Nominated by President Barack Obama on March 20, 2009, he was confirmed by the United States Senate on April 29, 2009. Safety was the top priority of his administration. He stepped down from the position on January 9, 2015 and Sarah Feinberg became the Acting Administrator on January 12, 2015, and subsequently the permanent Administrator.

Life and career
Szabo was born into a longtime railroad family. He started his own railroading career in 1976 with the Illinois Central Railroad, where he worked in numerous positions, including as a yard switchman, road trainman, and commuter conductor. He served as the United Transportation Union's State Legislative Director from 1996 to 2009.

Szabo served more than 20 years in municipal government.  He began his public service as a zoning commission member in his native south suburban Riverdale, Illinois, where he later served as a park district commissioner, village trustee, and ultimately mayor.  He also was a member of the South Suburban Mayors and Managers Association executive board and transportation committee and the regional Council of Mayors executive committee. Other prior service included membership on the Executive Council of Chicago Metropolis 2020 (later known as Metropolis Strategies), the Metropolitan Mayors Caucus, and the Legislative Committee of the Chicago Metropolitan Planning Council.

Szabo joined the Chicago Metropolitan Agency for Planning (CMAP) as a Senior Fellow in January 2015 and was named Executive Director in June 2015. CMAP serves as the seven-county region’s official comprehensive planning organization. Adopted in October 2010, its GO TO 2040 plan is helping the 284 communities of northeastern Illinois to implement strategies that address transportation, housing, economic development, open space, the environment, and other quality-of-life issues. The agency's ON TO 2050 comprehensive plan was adopted on October 10, 2018. Szabo announced his retirement from CMAP on February 15, 2019.

Szabo earned the Bachelor of Arts in Business Administration from Governors State University and received an honorary doctorate from Lewis University for his lifetime commitment to public service. In March 2015, Amtrak honored him by renaming its key operations facility at Chicago's Union Station as the "Joseph C. Szabo Chicago Control Center," which dispatches 580 trains and 120,000 passengers daily.

References

External links
 Full Biography at the FRA's Website

Living people
1957 births
Mayors of places in Illinois
People from Evergreen Park, Illinois
United States Department of Transportation officials
Obama administration personnel
21st-century American railroad executives